Brandy Hill is a suburb of the Port Stephens local government area in the Hunter Region of New South Wales, Australia. It was originally farmland but was subdivided in the 1980s and now supports a population of almost 700 people living on large, primarily residential, blocks. It overlooks working farmland and offers superb views of the greater Morpeth area, with visibility extending to Maitland.

Geography
To the north and east the suburb is bordered by Seaham, while to the south and west the suburb is surrounded by the Hunter River floodplains in Nelsons Plains, Wallalong and Seaham.

History

First inhabitants
In 1938, Walter John Enright wrote of the district's traditional owners:

On the impacts of colonisation in the Seaham district, Enright says:

On the subject of massacres of Aboriginal people and Torres Strait Islander people by settlers following colonisation, Enright writes:

The Seaham district and environs, however, may not have been entirely without such "frightful blots" on its history. In 1877, a massacre at nearby Wallalong was recounted in correspondence published by the Maitland Mercury and Hunter River General Advertiser:

Reflecting on the massacre, the correspondent goes on to remark that:

While the exact location of the massacre is not provided, an account of floods in 1857 describes how "the first breach it made was at Wallalong, whence the water gradually found its way over a considerable portion of Bowthorne, Hopewell, Barty's Swamps (sic), and all the low lands in that direction". To the east, Wallalong is separated from the "high land" of Brandy Hill, previously known as Ahalton and Warren's Station Paddock, by Barties Swamp. It is possible that the shootings and drownings described as occurring "between the brush and the high land" took place on or about Barties Swamp, below present-day Brandy Hill.

Ahalton and The Station Paddock (c1823-1870s)
Modern-day Brandy Hill is located on the site of Ahalton Farm and Warren's Station Paddock.

In correspondence dated 23 September 1823, James McClymont was informed that he would be granted 2000 acres in any part of the colony already surveyed as well as six convict servants who would be victualled from government stores. The land was granted in two portions – 1470 acres of land in the parish of Seaham and 530 acres in the parish of Butterwick. The property, totalling 2000 acres and covering much of present-day Brandy Hill, Wallalong, and the lowlands between, was known as "Ahalton Farm".

The McClymont's time at Ahalton, however, was to be short-lived. On or about 26 July 1825, a "desperate gang" of eleven bushrangers "plundered" the McClymont farm house, and the young family left the district soon thereafter. Upon McClymont's early death in 1829, aged 30, "Ahlaton" was advertised to be let for a term of seven years. The Sydney Gazette and New South Wales Advertiser described the property as thus:

Gone too, it seems, was the "desperate gang" that had driven McClymont and his family out of "Ahalton" only four years prior:

In 1847, a Free Presbyterian Church was built at "Ahalton", close to present-day Ralston Road. Approval to sell the Ahalton Church was granted by the Synod in November 1868.

Before the construction of the Maitland Junction to Dungog branch of the North Coast Line, a railway through Morpeth and Seaham was proposed. Although the line would have posed fewer engineering obstacles than the two alternatives, there were concerns that a bridge at Morpeth would hinder shipping and that a railway through Brandy Hill was superfluous on account of it servicing only "wallabies and bandicoots [living on] land [that is] unfit for the support of any other kind of population".

Travelling between the quarry and Raymond Terrace meant travelling a circuitous route through the Seaham township so Brandy Hill Drive was constructed to provide a shorter and more direct route. At moment many local residents are fighting the expansion of Brandy Hill due to destruction of koala breeding habitat.

Subdivision and suburb
Brandy Hill Drive continues to be used as an access route to the quarry, which is now operated by Hanson plc.

On 16 April 1993 the boundaries of Brandy Hill were gazetted and on 7 April 2000 the subdivision was formerly approved as a locality and became a suburb in its own right. The suburb is almost surrounded by Seaham.

Notes

References

Suburbs of Port Stephens Council